"Sweat of Your Brow" was the second single from Jully Black's debut album This Is Me. Released in 2005, the single featured a rap by Demarco, and was a significant airplay and video hit in Canada.

Official versions
"Sweat of Your Brow (Acappella)" - ??
"Sweat of Your Brow (Album Version)" - 3:20
"Sweat of Your Brow (HodgesAintSweatinIt Remix)" - 7:00
"Sweat of Your Brow (Just BE Remix)" - 4:21
"Sweat of Your Brow (No Crowd Mix)" - ??
"Sweat of Your Brow (Soul Diggaz Remix)" - 4:20
"Sweat of Your Brow (Trackheadz Remix)" - 4:59

Charts

References

2005 singles
2005 songs
Jully Black songs
Song recordings produced by Soul Diggaz
Reggae songs
Songs written by Erick Morillo
Songs written by The Mad Stuntman